Ezh (Ʒ, ʒ) is a letter in the extended Latin alphabet, a variant of the Z/z with a tail

Ezh or variation, may also refer to:

Biology
 Enhancer of zest homologue, an enzyme family (EZH) and its related gene family (ezh)
 EZH1, an enzyme and gene
 EZH2, a histone-lysine N-methyltransferase enzyme
 Ezh2 gene

Linguistics
 Ezh symbols
 Curly-tail ezh (◌̡_)
 D-ezh ligature (ʤ)
 Ezh with caron (Ǯ/ǯ)
 Ezh reversed (Ƹ/ƹ)
 L-ezh ligature (ɮ)

Industry
 Ezh missile, a variant of the Buk missile system
 Electriciteitsbedrijf Zuid-Holland (EZH), a subsidiary of PreussenElektra

See also

 Ʒ (disambiguation)